Gibraltar, Ontario can mean the following places:

Gibraltar, Grey County, Ontario
Gibraltar, Manitoulin District, Ontario